The Uncompahgre River is a tributary of the Gunnison River, approximately 75 mi (121 km) long, in southwestern Colorado in the United States.  Lake Como at 12,215 ft (3723m) in northern San Juan County, in the Uncompahgre National Forest in the northwestern San Juan Mountains is the headwaters of the river. It flows northwest past Ouray, Ridgway, Montrose, and Olathe and joins the Gunnison at Confluence Park in Delta.

The river forms Poughkeepsie Gulch and the Uncompahgre Gorge.  The major tributaries are all creeks draining the northwest San Juan Mountains.

There are two dams on the Uncompahgre River, a small diversion dam in the Uncompahgre Gorge, and Ridgway Dam below the town of Ridgway which forms Ridgway Reservoir.

The river is used for irrigation in the Uncompahgre Valley. Additionally, water from the Gunnison is diverted to the valley via the Gunnison Tunnel. The Uncompahgre is unnavigable except at high water.

The name Uncompahgre comes from the Ute word Uncompaghre, which loosely translates to "dirty water," "red lake," or "red water spring" and is likely a reference to the many hot springs in the vicinity of Ouray.

Conservation 
In October 2020, the City of Montrose announced a multi-year, multi-million dollar river restoration project along the Uncompahgre, including $785,000 total grants from the Colorado Water Conservation Board. The project will enhance fishing habitats, provide bank stabilization, increase river access and fishing opportunities for the public. 

The public-private partnership includes Colorado Parks & Wildlife, Colorado Trout Unlimited, and fly fishing company Mayfly Outdoors.

See also
List of rivers of Colorado
List of tributaries of the Colorado River
Water Conservation

References

Gunnison River
Rivers of Colorado
Rivers of Ouray County, Colorado
Rivers of San Juan County, Colorado
Tributaries of the Colorado River in Colorado
Colorado Western Slope